The 2015–16 season was the 47th campaign of the Scottish Men's National League, the national basketball league of Scotland. The league was rebranded as part of the Scottish Basketball Championships. 18 teams were split into Division 1, featuring 10 teams, and Division 2, featuring 8 teams. Boroughmuir Blaze won their 10th league title and their first in 38 years.

Teams

The line-up for the 2015-2016 season features the following teams:

Division 1
Ayrshire Tornadoes
Boroughmuir Blaze
City of Edinburgh Kings
Sony Falkirk Fury
Dunfermline Reign
Edinburgh University
Glasgow Storm
Glasgow University
St Mirren West College Scotland
Tayside Musketeers

Division 2
Boroughmuir Blaze B
City of Edinburgh Kings B
Glasgow Rocks II
Glasgow University B
Granite City Grizzlies
 Leuchars
Stirling Knights
West Lothian Wolves

Prior to the start of the season, Leuchars and Glasgow Rocks II withdrew from the league, leaving Division 2 with 6 teams.

Format
In Division 1, each team played each other twice, once home, once away, for a total of 18 games.

In Division 2, each team played each other three times, once home, once away, and once home or away, for a total of 15 games.

Division 1

League table

Playoffs
Quarter-finals

Semi-finals

Final

Division 2

League table

Scottish Cup
Scottish Cup (basketball)

Preliminary round

1st Round

Quarter-finals

Semi-finals

Final

References

Scottish Basketball Championship Men seasons
Scotland
Scotland
basketball
basketball